Brush Creek Bridge may refer to:

Brush Creek Bridge (Baxter Springs, Kansas) on historic US 66, also known as the Rainbow Bridge
Brush Creek Bridge (Coyville, Kansas), listed on the National Register of Historic Places in Wilson County, Kansas
Brush Creek Bridge (Oregon) on US 101